Cid is a populated place in Davidson County, North Carolina, United States.

Geography

Cid is located at latitude 35.712 and longitude -80.106. The elevation is 748 feet.

References

External links

Unincorporated communities in Davidson County, North Carolina
Unincorporated communities in North Carolina